The 1996 FIBA European League Final Four, or 1996 FIBA EuroLeague Final Four, was the 1995–96 season's FIBA European League Final Four tournament, organized by FIBA Europe. Panathinaikos won its first title, after defeating Barcelona in the final game.

Bracket

Semifinals

CSKA Moscow – Panathinaikos

FC Barcelona Banca Catalana – Real Madrid Teka

Third place game

Final

Final standings

Awards

FIBA European League Final Four MVP 
  Dominique Wilkins ( Panathinaikos)

FIBA European League Finals Top Scorer 
  Artūras Karnišovas ( FC Barcelona Banca Catalana)

FIBA European League All-Final Four Team

References

External links 
 1995–96 EuroLeague at FIBAEurope.com
 Linguasport

1995-1996
1995–96 in French basketball
1995–96 in Spanish basketball
1995–96 in Greek basketball
1995–96 in Russian basketball
International basketball competitions hosted by France
International sports competitions hosted by Paris
1996 in Paris
Basketball in Paris